Lazăr Sfera (29 April 1909, in Sân Mihai, Austria-Hungary (today in Serbia) – 24 April 1992) was a Romanian footballer who played as a defender.

Biography
At club level, he began his career at the youth team of Politehnica Timișoara from 1923 to 1925. He stayed at the club until 1929. He then left for Liga I team Banatul Timișoara before signing for one season at Rômania Cluj. He then left for Universitatea Cluj until 1934. He ended his career at Venus București. He retired in 1941.

With the Romania national football team, he was picked by joint coaches Josef Uridil and Costel Rădulescu to take part in the 1934 World Cup in Italy. The team were eliminated in the first round after a 2–1 defeat to Czechoslovakia.

Honours
Venus București
Liga I (3): 1936–37, 1938–39, 1939–40

Notes and references 
 
 

1909 births
1992 deaths
People from Alibunar
People from the Kingdom of Hungary
20th-century Romanian people
Romanian footballers
Romania international footballers
Liga I players
Victoria Cluj players
FC Universitatea Cluj players
FC Politehnica Timișoara players
Venus București players
1934 FIFA World Cup players
1938 FIFA World Cup players
Romanian Austro-Hungarians
Serbian people of Romanian descent
Romanians of Vojvodina
Association football defenders